Mohamed Obaid Al-Zahiri  is an Emirati football player. He played as a defender for United Arab Emirates in the 1984 Asian Cup. He scored an own goal in the 1997 FIFA Confederations Cup.

References

Stats

1967 births
1984 AFC Asian Cup players
1988 AFC Asian Cup players
United Arab Emirates international footballers
Emirati footballers
Living people
1997 FIFA Confederations Cup players
UAE Pro League players
Association football defenders
Footballers at the 1994 Asian Games
Asian Games competitors for the United Arab Emirates